David Peter Read (born 15 January 1941) is an English footballer, who played as a winger in the Football League for Chester.

References

Chester City F.C. players
Wolverhampton Wanderers F.C. players
Association football wingers
English Football League players
Living people
1941 births
Sportspeople from Stafford
English footballers